The crop-lien system was a credit system that became widely used by cotton farmers in the United States in the South from the 1860s to the 1940s.

History 
Sharecroppers and tenant farmers, who did not own the land they worked, obtained supplies and food on credit from local merchants. The merchants held a lien on the cotton crop, and the merchants and landowners were the first ones paid from its sale. What was left over went to the farmer.  The system ended in the 1940s as prosperity returned and many poor farmers moved permanently to cities and towns, where jobs were plentiful because of World War II. 

After the American Civil War, farmers in the South had little cash. During the war, British interests had invested in cotton plantations in Egypt and India, resulting in an oversupply of the commodity. Cotton prices dropped below the levels enjoyed in the 1850s. The crop-lien system was a way for farmers, mostly black, to get credit before the planting season by borrowing against the value of anticipated harvests. Local merchants provided food and supplies all year long on credit; when the cotton crop was harvested farmers turned it over to the merchant to pay back their loan.

In most cases, the crop did not cover the debt, and the farmer started the next year in the red as an indentured servant. Working through a vicious cycle of trying to pay off debt and accumulating more and more debt left many farmers working the rest of their lives under their landowner, usually a white farmer. Additionally, sharecroppers had no mules or tools, but tenant farmers had them and commanded a larger share of the crop. The owner took the rest. At harvest time, the merchant collected his debts from the sale of the crop. 

The merchants had to borrow the money to buy supplies and, in turn, charged the farmer interest as well as a higher price for merchandise bought on such credit. The merchant insisted that more cotton (or some other cash crop) be grown (nothing else paid well) and thus came to dictate the crops that a farmer grew.

See also
Sharecropping, a related system of agriculture that also developed in the post-Civil War South.
Caspiana Plantation Store, a historical building that once exemplified the use of the crop-lien system between 1906 to 1942.

References

Further reading
 Thomas D. Clark, "The Furnishing and Supply System in Southern Agriculture since 1865," Journal of Southern History, Vol. 12, No. 1 (Feb., 1946), pp. 24–44  in JSTOR
 Steven Hahn. The Roots of Southern Populism: Yeoman Farmers and the Transformation of the Georgia Upcountry, 1850-1890 (2006)
 Roger L. Ransom and Richard Sutch. "Debt Peonage in the Cotton South After the Civil War," Journal of Economic History, Vol. 32, No. 3 (Sep., 1972), pp. 641–669 in JSTOR
 Roger Ransom and Richard Sutch. " The "Lock-in" Mechanism and Overproduction of Cotton in the Postbellum South," Agricultural History, Vol. 49, No. 2 (Apr., 1975), pp. 405-425 in JSTOR
 Woodman, Harold. King Cotton and His Retainers (1967)
 Harold Woodman. New South, New Law: The Legal Foundations of Credit and Labor Relations in the Postbellum Agricultural South (1995)
 Gavin Wright and Howard Kunreuther. "Cotton, Corn and Risk in the Nineteenth Century," Journal of Economic History, Vol. 35, No. 3 (Sep., 1975), pp. 526–551 in JSTOR

Agriculture in the United States
History of the Southern United States
Credit
Liens